Horta is a station in the Barcelona metro network, served by L5, located under carrer de Lisboa, in the Horta-Guinardó district of Barcelona. It was opened in 1967, when an extension of the line into the neighbourhood of the same name from Vilapicina was opened.

The partially curved island-platform station has a ticket hall at either end, one with two accesses, the other with one.

Horta was the terminus before the line was extended in July 2010 towards Vall d'Hebron, meeting L3.

Services

See also
List of Barcelona Metro stations

External links

Horta station at Trenscat.com

Railway stations in Spain opened in 1967
Barcelona Metro line 5 stations
Transport in Horta-Guinardó